The Invincible Gladiator (Italian: Il gladiatore invincibile, Spanish: El gladiador invencible) is a 1961 film directed by Alberto De Martino and Antonio Momplet.  The film stars Richard Harrison.

Plot summary 
Twelve-year-old royal king Darius, the tyrannical Rabirius, leads Acastus, a member of the Roman Empire. Gladiator Rezius saves the life of Rabirius and is tasked with leading a military expedition to destroy the band of mountain robbers. In the course of his mission, Rezius discovers that the bandits are in fact rebels led by Darius' sister Sira. Rezius's gladiator friends raise the people to rebellion, Darius ascends the throne, and Sira and Rezius get each other.

Cast 
Richard Harrison as Rezio
Isabelle Corey as Sira
Livio Lorenzon as Ito
Leo Anchóriz as Rabirio
José Marco as Vibio
Ricardo Canales as Semanzio
Antonio Molino Rojo as Euclante
Edoardo Nevola as Dario
Jole Mauro as Xenia
Giorgio Ubaldi

Production 
The film's exterior scenes were shot at Sevilla Film Studios in Sevilla and in La Pedriza, while the interior scenes were filmed at the De Paolis Studios in Rome.

Release
The Invincible Gladiator was released in Italy on 31 October 1961. It was released in the United States in September 1963 with a 96-minute running time.

References

Footnotes

Sources

External links 

1961 films
1961 adventure films
Peplum films
Spanish historical adventure films
1960s Spanish-language films
Films directed by Alberto De Martino
Films directed by Antonio Momplet
Films about gladiatorial combat
1961 directorial debut films
Sword and sandal films
1960s Italian films